Jukka Koskelainen (born 1961) is a Finnish poet and recipient of the Eino Leino Prize in 1993 along with Jyrki Kiiskinen.

References

Finnish writers
Recipients of the Eino Leino Prize
1961 births
Living people

International Writing Program alumni
Date of birth missing (living people)